Tongariro is a village and rural community, located east of Taumarunui and west of Kuratau on State Highway 41.

It includes the Pāpākai Marae and Rākeipoho meeting house, a traditional tribal meeting place for the Ngāti Tūwharetoa hapū of Ngāti Hikairo.

Name
The name Tongariro is derived from the Māori words tonga meaning south wind and riro meaning carried away.

References

Populated places in Manawatū-Whanganui
Ruapehu District